William Rae (died 1367) was a 14th-century bishop of Glasgow. His background is obscure, although it is known that before ascending to the bishopric he was a precentor of the diocese of Glasgow. On the death of John Wishart in 1338, William was elected to the see. His election was confirmed by Pope Benedict XII, who on 11 February 1339 ordered Annibald de Ceccano, bishop of Tusculum, to consecrate William. William was consecrated at Avignon a short while later. Curiously, his predecessor Wishart had been consecrated by the same man, in the same location. William's episcopate was comparatively long, and he died on 27 January 1367. He was succeeded by Walter Wardlaw.

Glasgow Old Bridge

Bishop Rae's main contribution to his city was the erection of a stone bridge in around 1345 to replace an earlier wooden bridge. This bridge stood at around the same location as the current Victoria Bridge, near the bottom of the Bridgegate.

References

Dowden, John, The Bishops of Scotland, ed. J. Maitland Thomson, (Glasgow, 1912)

1367 deaths
Bishops of Glasgow
14th-century Scottish Roman Catholic bishops
Year of birth unknown